San Bartolome Church may refer to:

 San Bartolome Church (Magalang), Philippines
 San Bartolome Church (Malabon), Philippines